George Bloomer may refer to:

 George Frost Bloomer (1858–1938), English composer and organist
 George G. Bloomer (born 1963), American evangelist, pastor and entrepreneur